{{Infobox national futsal team
| Name                     = Iran

| Badge_size               = 250px
| FIFA Trigramme           = IRN
| FIFA Rank                = 6 (12 march 2023)
| FIFA max                 = 
| FIFA max date            = 
| FIFA min                 = 
| FIFA min date            = 
| Nickname                 = Team Melli (Persian: تیم ملی  )"The National Team",
Cheetahs (Persian: یوزها) (Persian: شیرهای ایرانی) "Iranian Lions"
| Association              = FFIRI
| Confederation            = AFC (Asia)
| Coach                    = Vahid Shamsaei
| Assistant coach          = Shahabeddin Sofalmanesh
| Captain                  = Hossein Tayyebi
| Most caps                = Ali Asghar Hassanzadeh (297)
| Top scorer               = Vahid Shamsaei (392)
| Home Stadium             = Azadi Indoor Stadium
| pattern_la1           = _irn22h
| pattern_b1            = _irn22h
| pattern_ra1           = _irn22h
| pattern_sh1           = _irn22h
| pattern_so1           = 
| leftarm1              = FFFFFF
| body1                 = FFFFFF
| rightarm1             = FFFFFF
| shorts1               = FFFFFF
| socks1                = FFFFFF
| pattern_la2           = _irn22a
| pattern_b2            = _irn22a
| pattern_ra2           = _irn22a
| pattern_sh2           = _irn22a
| pattern_so2           = 
| leftarm2              = EC0000
| body2                 = EC0000
| rightarm2             = EC0000
| shorts2               = EC0000
| socks2                = EC0000
| First game            =  19–6 (Hong Kong; 2 May 1992)
| Largest loss             =  8–1 (Rio de Janeiro, Brazil; 6 October 2000)
| Largest win              =  36–0 (Kuala Lumpur, Malaysia; 7 March 1999)
| World cup apps           = 8 (all non-selective)
| World cup first          = 1992
| World cup best           =  Third Place (2016)
4th place (1992)
| Regional name            = AFC Futsal Asian Cup
| Regional cup apps        = 16 (all)
| Regional cup first       = 1999
| Regional cup best        =  Champions (1999, 2000, 2001, 2002, 2003, 2004, 2005, 2007, 2008, 2010, 2016, 2018)
 Runners up (2014, 2022) 
 Third Place (2006, 2012)
| 2ndRegional name         = WAFF Futsal Championship
| 2ndRegional cup apps     = 2
| 2ndRegional cup first    = 2007
| 2ndRegional cup best     =  Champions (2007, 2012)
| AMF World cup apps       = 
| AMF World cup first      = 
| AMF World cup best       = 
| Grand Prix apps          = 7
| Grand Prix first         = 2007
| Grand Prix best          =  Runners-up (2007, 2009, 2015)
 Third Place (2013, 2014)
4th place (2010, 2011)
| Confederations cup apps  = 2
| Confederations cup first = 2009,
2022
| Confederations cup best  =  Champions (2009)
 Runners up (2022)
|Badge=Flag of Iran.svg|caption=Flag of Iran}}
The Iran national futsal team' represents Iran in international futsal competitions and is controlled by the Futsal Commission of the Iranian Football Federation. According to the Futsal World Ranking, it is ranked 5th in the world, and 1st amongst Asian Football Confederation members.

The Iranian national team is a regular participant of the FIFA Futsal World Cup, reaching third place in 2016, after eliminating the favorites, Brazil, in the round of 16. Iran has won the first Futsal Confederations Cup in 2009, and also reached the second place in the Grand Prix de Futsal, known as Futsal Mini-World Cup, in multiple editions.

Team image
Nicknames
The Iranian national team has received several nicknames from supporters and media. The most common one used to refer the team is "Team Melli", which literally means "The National Team". Also, "Cheetahs" are often used due to the existence of cheetahs in Iran. The picture of a cheetah is on the home kit of Iran helping to support and protect them.

Home stadium

Iran plays the home games at the Azadi Indoor Stadium with a capacity of 6,583 spectators.

Results and fixtures

Previous matches

 

Coaching staff

Current coaching staffLast updated: 2 October 2022Team
Current squad

Previous squads

FIFA Futsal World Cup
1992 FIFA Futsal World Cup squads
 1996 FIFA Futsal World Cup squads
 2000 FIFA Futsal World Cup squads
 2004 FIFA Futsal World Cup squads
 2008 FIFA Futsal World Cup squads
 2012 FIFA Futsal World Cup squads
 2016 FIFA Futsal World Cup squads
 2021 FIFA Futsal World Cup squads

AFC Futsal Asian Cup
1999 AFC Futsal Championship squads
2000 AFC Futsal Championship squads
2001 AFC Futsal Championship squads
2002 AFC Futsal Championship squads
2003 AFC Futsal Championship squads
2004 AFC Futsal Championship squads
2005 AFC Futsal Championship squads
2007 AFC Futsal Championship squads
2008 AFC Futsal Championship squads
2010 AFC Futsal Championship squads
2018 AFC Futsal Championship squads
2022 AFC Futsal Championship squads

Notable players
Mehdi Abtahi
Siamak Dadashi
Mohsen Garousi
Behzad Gholampour
Mohammad Reza Heidarian
Babak Masoumi
Reza Nasseri
Mostafa Nazari
Saeid Rajabi
Vahid Shamsaei
Mohammad Reza Sangsefidi
Sadegh Varmazyar

Captains
FIFA Futsal World Cup

AFC Futsal Asian Cup

Competitive record*Denotes draws includes knockout matches decided on penalty shootouts. **Red border indicates that the tournament was hosted on home soil. ***Gold, silver, bronze backgrounds indicates 1st, 2nd and 3rd finishes respectively. Bold text indicates best finish in tournament.''

FIFA Futsal World Cup

AFC Futsal Asian Cup

Asian Indoor and Martial Arts Games

* Iran played with U-23 team in this tournament.

Grand Prix de Futsal

Futsal Confederations Cup

West Asian Championship

* Iran played with U-23 team in this tournament.

See also
Futsal in Iran
Iran national football team
Iran national beach soccer team
Iran women's national football team
Iran women's national futsal team
Futsal
UEFA Futsal Champions League

References

 
Asian national futsal teams
National